Porum is a town in Muskogee County, Oklahoma, United States. It was named for John Porum Davis, a rancher, Civil War veteran, and Cherokee Nation councilman from the Canadian District in Indian Territory. The community was first known as Porum Gap, which united with another village named Starvilla in 1905. The product of this union became the present town of Porum. The population was 727 at the 2010 census, an increase of 0.3 percent from the figure of 725 recorded in 2000.

History
The area is rich in history, including that of the Starr clan who were of the Cherokee "Treaty faction" and became immersed in troubles during the early turbulent days of the Cherokee Nation.  They were attacked by, and counterattacked, men of the Ross faction. Tom Starr was alleged to have killed 100 men in his time, although the figure may be exaggerated. Tom was a half-blood, Irish and Cherokee, and had five sons, one of whom was Sam who became the husband of Belle Starr, forever linked with the history of Porum. In later years, Pony Starr who lived on the edge of Porum was involved in the Porum Range War and was regarded as the straightest shot and most fearless man of his clan.

A post office was established in Porum Gap March 25, 1890. The Midland Valley Railroad came to the Porum area in 1903. The town of Porum was formed in 1905, following the merger of Porum Gap and Starvilla.

Geography
Porum is located at  (35.358228, -95.265930).

Demographics

As of the census of 2000, there were 725 people, 301 households, and 202 families residing in the town. There were 341 housing units at an average density of 453.6 per square mile (175.5/km2). The racial makeup of the town was 61.79% White, 1.52% African American, 28.83% Native American, 0.14% from other races, and 7.72% from two or more races. Hispanic or Latino of any race were 0.83% of the population.

There were 301 households, out of which 31.6% had children under the age of 18 living with them, 43.9% were married couples living together, 17.9% had a female householder with no husband present, and 32.6% were non-families. 28.9% of all households were made up of individuals, and 16.9% had someone living alone who was 65 years of age or older. The average household size was 2.41 and the average family size was 2.97.

In the town, the population was spread out, with 27.9% under the age of 18, 10.5% from 18 to 24, 20.7% from 25 to 44, 24.3% from 45 to 64, and 16.7% who were 65 years of age or older. The median age was 35 years. For every 100 females, there were 87.3 males. For every 100 females age 18 and over, there were 90.2 males.

The median income for a household in the town was $18,009, and the median income for a family was $19,474. Males had a median income of $25,357 versus $18,333 for females. The per capita income for the town was $9,147. About 35.3% of families and 41.3% of the population were below the poverty line, including 51.0% of those under age 18 and 33.0% of those age 65 or over.

References

Towns in Muskogee County, Oklahoma
Towns in Oklahoma